The Widowhood of Karolina Žašler is a 1976 Yugoslav comedy film directed by Matjaž Klopčič. It was entered into the 27th Berlin International Film Festival.

Cast
 Marija Bačko
 Polde Bibič - Žašler
 Miranda Caharija - Korl's wife
 Boris Cavazza - Tenor
 Maks Furijan - Lilek
 Marjeta Gregorač - Anica
 Marijan Hinteregger - Fonza
 Milena Muhič - Filomena
 Marko Okorn - Lojz
 Anton Petje - Korl
 Radko Polič - Accordion player
 Zlatko Šugman - Prunk
 Dare Ulaga - Gabrijel
 Dare Valič - Driver
 Milena Zupančič - Karolina Žašler

References

External links

1976 films
1976 comedy films
Films directed by Matjaž Klopčič
Slovene-language films
Yugoslav comedy films
Slovenian comedy films
Films set in Yugoslavia